The RusSki Gorki Jumping Center is a ski jumping venue located in the Esto-Sadok village on the northern slope of Aibga Ridge in Krasnaya Polyana, Russia.

History

It hosted the ski jumping and the ski jumping part of the Nordic combined event at the 2014 Winter Olympics in Sochi. Two Olympic jumps of K95 (HS102) and K125 (HS140) are constructed for these games with scheduled completion in 2011. Additional hills for youth training of K72, K45 and K25 will be constructed with the Olympic hills. It was first used in 2012.

Events

Men

women

References

Sochi2014.com profile

Venues of the 2014 Winter Olympics
Ski jumping venues in Russia
Olympic Nordic combined venues
Olympic ski jumping venues
Sport in Krasnodar Krai
Buildings and structures in Krasnodar Krai
Buildings and structures in Sochi
2012 establishments in Russia
Sports venues completed in 2012